Building the Machine is a studio album by former Deep Purple, Black Sabbath and Trapeze vocalist/ bassist Glenn Hughes. It was his eighth solo studio album and was released in 2001 on SPV, DNA and Nippon Crown records.

History
Building The Machine has a similar feel to Hughes’ previous album, 2000’s Return of Crystal Karma. Many of the songs have a hard rock sound with a funk edge, although the funk aspect is somewhat toned down on this album and the songs are more driven by guitar riffs than bass lines.

This album marks the fourth collaboration between Hughes and longtime guitarist and co-songwriter JJ Marsh. The album also features contributions from Hughes’ regular drummer of the period Gary Ferguson, keyboardists Vince DiCola and John Beasley and guitarist Pat Travers, who duets with Hughes on the Rare Earth cover I Just Want To Celebrate. Bobby Kimball of Toto provides backing vocals on two of the tracks.

The track High Ball Shooter is a newly recorded version of the Deep Purple song, which originally featured on the album Stormbringer.

The Japanese version of the album includes the track Cosmic Spell, which was written by Hughes and Pat Travers.

The opening track Can’t Stop The Flood also kicked off Hughes’ 2004 live album Soulfully Live in the City of Angels and often frequents his set-lists.

Track listing
"Can't Stop the Flood" – 4:11 (Hughes, Marsh)
"Inside" – 4:52 (Hughes, Marsh)
"Out On Me" – 5:32 (Hughes)
"I Just Want To Celebrate" – 3:23 (Fekaris, Zesses)
"Don't Let it Slip Away" – 4:57 (Hughes, Marsh, Scott)
"Feels Like Home" – 4:38 (Crook, Hughes)
"High Ball Shooter" – 4:29 (Blackmore, Coverdale, Hughes, Lord, Paice)
"When You Fall" – 4:57 (Hughes, Marsh)
"I Will Follow You" – 6:11 (Hughes, Marsh)
"Beyond the Numb" – 7:51 (Hughes)
"Big Sky" – 4:38 (Ellis, Hughes)

Japan Bonus Track
"Cosmic Spell" – 4:49 (Hughes, Travers)

Personnel
Glenn Hughes – Vocals, Bass
JJ Marsh – Guitars except tracks 4&11/ Backing Vocals on track 8
Gary Ferguson - Drums

Special Guests:

Pat Travers – guitar, vocals on track 4
Brett Ellis – guitar on track 11
Vince DiCola – Keyboards except tracks 4&9*
John Beasley - Keyboards on track 9
Bobby Kimball – Backing Vocals on tracks 2&5
Doug Bossi – background vocals on track 8
David K. Tedds – background vocals on track 4
Lol Tolhurst – background vocals on track 4
Cindy Tolhurst – background vocals on track 4

References

External links
 Building The Machine entry at glennhughes.com

2001 albums
Glenn Hughes albums
Funk rock albums by English artists